Mahboob Chowk Clock Tower is a five-storied architectural clock tower which was built in 1892 by Asman Jah, Prime Minister of Hyderabad. Named after the 6th Nizam of Hyderabad - (Mir Mahboob Ali Khan), the Mahboob Chowk area is considered to be an important part architectural heritage of Hyderabad.

The clock tower is erected in the midst of the small garden; it has four large clocks on its sides which enable the time to be seen from any direction. The clock tower is designed in the Turkish style. The tower is located west of the Charminar, not far from Laad Bazaar.

References

Buildings and structures in Hyderabad, India
Tourist attractions in Hyderabad, India
Hyderabad State
Heritage structures in Hyderabad, India
Clock towers in India